Adam Brown of Blackford (c.1660–1711) was a Scottish merchant who served as Lord Provost of Edinburgh.

Life
He lived in Blackford, south of Edinburgh.

In 1710 he succeeded Sir Patrick Johnston as Lord Provost. He died in office in October 1711 and was replaced by Sir Robert Blackwood of Pitreavie.

He is buried in the Covenanters Prison section of Greyfriars Kirkyard.

Family
He is possibly grandfather or great grandfather of the later Lord Provost Walter Brown who was a wine merchant.

References

1711 deaths
Lord Provosts of Edinburgh
Burials at Greyfriars Kirkyard
Year of birth uncertain